Fidelis oga Orgah (born 1953 in Adim Akpa) was a Nigerian prelate of the Catholic Church who served as bishop of the Roman Catholic Diocese of Otukpo. He was appointed bishop in 1995. He died in 2000.

References 

1953 births
2000 deaths
Nigerian Roman Catholic bishops